Platform  may refer to:

Arts 
 Platform, an arts centre at The Bridge, Easterhouse, Glasgow
 Platform (1993 film), a 1993 Bollywood action film
 Platform (2000 film), a 2000 film by Jia Zhangke
 Platform (art group), an interdisciplinary art group that researches the oil industry
 Platform (Australian art group), an artists group based in Melbourne
 Platform (novel), a 2001 novel by Michel Houellebecq

Physical objects and features 
 Carbonate platform, a type of sedimentary body
 Cargo platform, a pallet used to ship cargo and heavy machines by forklift or manual lift
 Diving platform, used in diving
 Jumping platform, naturally occurring platforms, or platforms made in an ad hoc way for cliff jumping
 Oil platform, a structure built for oil production
 Platform, a component of scaffolding
 Platform (geology), the part of a continental craton that is covered by sedimentary rocks
 Platform (shopping center) in Culver City, Greater Los Angeles, California
 Theatre platform, a standard piece of theatrical scenery
 Platform mound, an earthwork intended to support a structure or activity
 Platform shoe, a kind of shoe with a thick sole
 Railway platform, an area at a railway station to alight from/embark on trains or trams

Politics 
 Party platform, a list of principles held by a political party

Technology 
 Computing platform, a framework on which applications may be run
 Platform game, a genre of video games
 Car platform, a set of components shared by several vehicle models
 Weapons platform, a system or structure that carries weapons
 Web platform

Other uses
 Economic platform, an intermediary in a two-sided market
 Platform (business model), a business model that creates value by facilitating exchanges between two or more interdependent groups
 Platform conodonts, a type of conodonts with highly evolved feeding elements

See also
 The Platform (disambiguation)
Platform 4, a theatre company in Hampshire, England
 Platform economy, economic and social activity facilitated by platforms, typically online sales or technology frameworks  
 Platform release, a gradual film distribution strategy
 Platforming (disambiguation)
 Platformism, a form of anarchist organization that seeks unity from its participants
 "Platforms", a song by M.I.A. from AIM